Fuzztone Fizzadelic is the debut album by The Now, released by Damaged Goods. The album was recorded over 2 short days at The Lodge Recording Studio in Northampton between 2002 and 2005. All recorded tracks reflected the bands setlist at the start of 1977 and were recorded almost live in the studio. All songs were written and recorded by The Now and performed by the original members, Mike McGuire, Steve Rolls, Joe MacColl and Faz Farrow

Track listing
 Why
 Development Corporations
 Labour Party
 Here It Comes Now
 Third World War
 You Student
 9 O Clock
 Into the 80's
 In The Earth
 The Invaders
 Womans Own
 DC77
 Here It Comes Now (Dub)

Personnel
 Mike McGuire : Vocals
 Steve Rolls  : Guitars
 Joe MacColl  : Drums
 Faz Farrow   : Bass

The title

The title of the album, Fuzztone Fizzadelic, comes from a review of The first single by The Now called Development Corporations / Why? (Ultimate Records, ULT401, 1977), in Sounds (music paper available in '77) written by Jon Savage. The review simply said:

'A primitive but wonderful single from a criminally underrated D.I.Y. Punk  band from Peterborough. This sounds like the Desperate Bicycles, and is a very simple, but  effective protest song about a subject that should be dear to your hearts. And fuzztone fizzedelic guitar! You need more?'

The cover

The cover photo was taken early in 1977. Location: Somewhere in the New England area of Peterborough. The people shown are (from right to left):

 Steve Rolls    (The Now)
 Faz Farrow     (The Now)
 Pete Chambers  (Friend of The Now. Pete almost became the bass player of The Now but he changed his mind).
 Allen Adams    (Manager of The Now)
 Mike McGure    (The Now)
 Paul Wicks     (ex The Now)
 Joe MacColl    (The Now)
 Debbie Cutbill (Girlfriend of Joe)  
 Gina           (Friend of The Now)
 Mary           (Friend of The Now. Gina's Sister)
 Photographed by Debbie Weiss (Girlfriend of Steve.....with Petes camera)

References

The Now albums
2005 debut albums